Hindustani Sipahi is a 2002 Hindi film directed by Prasanta Bal and produced by Mohan Kukreja. The film is based on Ferari Fauj, a famous Bengali play by Utpal Dutt. Victor Banerjee is the cinematographer of the film. Set against the backdrop of the revolutionary movement for Indian independence, it narrates the tale of some Indian revolutionaries who form an uprising against the British colonialism in India. It stars Mithun Chakraborty, Debashree Roy, Sabyasachi Chakraborty, Lily Chakravarty, Debraj Ray, Indrani Haldar, Kunal Mitra, Kaushik Sen and Debesh Roy Choudhury. Music of the film was composed by Inderneel Chatterjee with lyrics penned by Om Deeshwal.

Plot
Ashok, a revolutionary bombards the car of the police-super Wilmort and meets schoolmaster Debabrata Bose and his revolutionary team at Nilkuthi. Debabrata Bose informs Ashok that he has been instructed by Shanti Roy, the mentor of their team to stay at Sirajul's house as he will not be able to return his home because Brajen Chowdhury, the zamindar of Bhubandanga has identified his muffler which he accidentally dropped after the bombing. Radha gives a letter of Kanti Roy to Ashok who reads it and finds that they have been instructed to meet at the graveyard the next day. When they gather at the graveyard, schoolmaster Debabrata Bose reveals Kanti Roy's plan that they have to dig down a tunnel from Radha's house to the graveyard. In the middle of their conversation they discover police over a distance. Everyone flees while Ashok chased by dogs takes resort to his house where police arrives and arrests Ashok.

Debabrata Bose reveals to his team members that Kumud has a secret affair with Devyani Dasgupta, the daughter of Hiten Dasgupta who is the officer-in-charge of Bhubabdanga. Fumed with Kumud, his team members think that Kumud is a spy of Hiten Dasgupta and chases him down the tunnel to kill him but Radha finally stands between them and urges not to kill Kumud. They spare him. Hiten Dasgupta keeps torturing Ashok who never yields to say who Kanti Roy is. Hiten Dasgupta brings Ashok's wife Shachi to the cell where Ashok is kept and in front of him several ruffians rape her. Still Ashok does not yield to reveal who Kanti Roy is. Ashok becomes seriously ill with high fever. He keeps muttering to himself and from this Hiten Dasgupta learns that a woman named Radha is involved with this revolutionary activity. Sirajul comes to Debabrata Bose to give him Kanti Roy's letter. Debabrata learns that Hiten Dasgupta has planned to check Radha's house. He along with his team take resort into the tunnel while Radha alone stays up. Hiten Dasgupta comes and discovers a spade, a pitcher and a wooden stuff beneath it in Radha's bedroom. He feels dubious and breaks the pitcher apart. Radha takes a revolver out but accidentally drops it which Hiten Dasgupta at once picks up. Now Radha turns into a fine actress. She narrates the whole plan to Dasgupta and makes him believe that she has been exhausted serving the team and intends to stand out of this. She stealthily poisons a glass of wine and gives it to Dasgupta who drinks it and dies. Kanti Roy arrives at Radha's place and informs everyone that Jackson has planned to go to Dhaka from Bhubandanga; and the night he will leave, an attack has to be launched by them at the steamer port to bombard Jackson along with the port and the oil depot. Kumud changes his mind and decides to stand out of all the revolutionary activities as he intends to settle with his ladylove Debjani. He stealthily goes to Prakash Mukherjee, the new officer-in-charge and reveals the plan of Kanti Roy. Ashok overhears this conversation. He evades through the window of the toilet and shoots Kumud to death on the way back to his home. Prakash Mukherjee comes to check Radha's house where he arrests Debabrata Bose. Radha is compelled to guide him along with his unit through the tunnel where he faces fight-back from the hidden revolutionists. At the same time the rest of the revolutionists under Kanti Roy's leadership charge upon the police at port. Ashok joins them. He sets himself on fire and runs into the oil depot.

Cast
Soumitra Chatterjee as Yogen Chatterjee
Debashree Roy as Shachi
Mithun Chakraborty as Ashok Chatterjee
Sabyasachi Chakraborty as Nilmoni Mitra/Kanti Roy
Lily Chakravarty as Bangabasi
Debraj Ray as Schoolmaster Debabrata Bose
Indrani Haldar as Radha
Kunal Mitra as Jyotirmoy
Kaushik Sen as Kumud
Manik Das as Sirajul
Bishwajit Sarkar as Bipin
Debesh Roy Choudhury as Prakash Mukherjee
Piyali Mitra as Devyani Dasgupta
Shobha Sen (Guest appearance)
Victor Banerjee (Guest appearance)

Crew

References

External links

2002 films
2000s Hindi-language films